Erich Ott (born 3 December 1944 in Oberammergau, Germany) is a German sculptor, engraver, and designer.

He is best known for his design of numerous German commemorative coins and designed

the German Deutsche Mark coins
in 1977, the 5 DM coin, commemorating the 200th anniversary of Carl Friedrich Gauss.
in 1981, the 5 DM coin, commemorating the 150th anniversary of the death of Heinrich Friedrich Karl vom und zum Stein.
in 1985, the 5 DM coin, commemorating the 150th anniversary of first railroad in Germany.
in 1990, the back of the commemorative 2 Deutsche Mark coin dedicated to Franz-Josef Strauß, which was issued from 1990 to 2001 with more than 140 million examples.
in 1991, the 10 DM coin, commemorating the 200th anniversary of the Brandenburg Gate.
in 1993, the 10 DM coin, commemorating the 1000th anniversary of Potsdam.
in 2000, the 10 DM coin, commemorating the 1,200th anniversary of the Dome in Aachen.
German commemorative Euro coins
in 2004, the back of the 10 euro coin to commemorate the 2006 FIFA World Cup in Germany.
in 2004, the 10 euro coin to commemorate the 200th anniversary of the birth of the poet Eduard Mörike
in 2005, the reverse of the 100 euro note in gold for the occasion of the FIFA Football World Cup 2006 in Germany.
in 2012, the Bavaria 2 euro coin in the series "Bundesländer" featuring Schloss Neuschwanstein

References

External links
 Ott's website

1944 births
People from Garmisch-Partenkirchen (district)
German engravers
Living people